SWO or Swo may refer to:

Places
 SeaWorld Orlando, a theme park in Florida, US
 Southwestern Ontario, a region in Canada
 Stillwater Regional Airport (IATA and FAA LID code: SWO)

Science and technology
 Strict weak ordering, in mathematics

Other uses
 Socialist Workers Organization (disambiguation)
 Surface warfare officer
 Swo, a language of Cameroon
 Staff Weather Officer, United States Air Force personnel
 Scene World Magazine, a disk magazine for the Commodore 64 computer